WRUR-FM is a radio station located in the Rochester, New York area and broadcasts at 88.5 FM. Its transmitter is located on Pinnacle Hill in Rochester.

WRUR-FM is the public radio station of the University of Rochester. It partners with WXXI Public Broadcasting Council to provide news and music programming.

Technical history
WRUR began as a low-power AM radio station on 650 kHz in the fall of 1948, broadcasting from the University campus. In 1950, its studios moved from the U of R campus to the Eastman School of Music. Studios moved again in 1955 to the university's Todd Union basement, where most broadcasts originate today. The FCC granted a license in 1965 to WRUR-FM, broadcasting on a frequency of 90.1 MHz using a 10 watt transmitter. In February 1969, power increased to 5,000 watts. Power was reduced and the frequency changed to 88.5 MHz later that year. In February 1970, power increased to 20,000 watts, but interfered with on-campus chemistry experiments, and power was again reduced until 1975 when the chemistry department moved. In 1993, the transmitter location moved to the downtown Hyatt Regency Rochester hotel and power increased to 3,000 watts with a new antenna atop the building. It stayed there until 2007 when the transmitter and antenna was moved to WXXI's tower on Pinnacle Hill as part of the partnership with them, increasing the coverage area. In 2011, WRUR was granted a power increase to 15.1 kilowatts and an increase in antenna height. The Corporation for Public Broadcasting has also awarded WXXI a Digital Conversion Grant, to facilitate converting WRUR to IBOC, as part of the power increase, with a new transmitter and new panel antenna.

Content and management history

For most of its existence, WRUR was staffed and run almost entirely by students with minimal input from University administrators.  Content was largely eclectic and free-form, and included shows such as "Jazz in the Morning," the "Folk Lunch," a weekend late-night dance music show called "Club 88," Saturday and Sunday morning classical music shows, and progressive music programming on weekday afternoons.  This changed around 2004 when school administrators took a more active role in station management and forged a partnership with WXXI in response to the FCC's crackdown on indecency violations, among other factors.  This took most FM programming decisions out of the hands of students.  The station today is primarily a AAA-formatted music station, with NPR newsmagazine during the morning and afternoon drive.  Open Tunings with Scott Regan is a flagship music program on the station.

The University of Rochester students maintain an active presence in the evening on the FM station during the academic year and a more vibrant online presence under the name The Sting. Additionally, around 2014, the University of Rochester's TV club, URTV, merged into WRUR to form WRUR-TV, a TV station that broadcasts on the university's cable TV system and puts out videos on YouTube.

References

External links
WRUR-FM Website
WRUR online 
 

University of Rochester
RUR-FM
RUR-FM
NPR member stations
Radio stations established in 1948